Peter Paul Flores (born January 30, 1960) is an American politician. He represented District 19 in the Texas Senate from 2018 to 2021. A member of the Republican Party, he was the first Hispanic Republican Texas State Senator in Texas history, and he was the first Republican to be elected in District 19 since 1879 during the Reconstruction Era. In the 2020 election, Flores was defeated by his Democratic challenger. Flores won the Republican nomination for Texas State Senate District 24 on May 24, 2022, defeating Raul Reyes by 60% to 40%.

Early life
Flores's parents, Margarito and Lilia Flores, retired in Laredo, Texas. Flores grew up in South Texas. He graduated from Laredo Martin High and attended Laredo Junior College before graduating from Texas A&M University. Flores worked as a farm technician for Texas A&M Veterinary School then was accepted to the Texas Game Warden Academy in 1985.

Career
Flores retired as a Colonel Game Warden for Texas Parks and Wildlife. He is a former leader of Texas Parks and Wildlife's statewide law enforcement division. He was the first Hispanic to hold that position.

Texas Senate
In 2016, Flores ran for the Texas Senate District 19, losing to Democratic incumbent Carlos Uresti with about 40% of the vote. District 19 is geographically the largest district in the Texas Senate, with about 400 miles of the Texas–Mexico border, and it contains all or part of 17 counties spread over more than 35,000 square miles in the southwestern portion of the state. The district is 66% Hispanic.

2018 special election
Uresti resigned from his senate seat after being convicted of federal fraud and money laundering charges in February 2018, and a special election was called. Flores ran for the seat again, and in an upset, Flores won the September 18, 2018, special election for state senate district 19 over former state representative and U.S. Congressman Pete Gallego 57% to 43%. Flores took 81% of the Medina County, Texas vote, yielding him a 3,000-vote lead, which Gallego could not overcome. Flores served out the remaining two years and three months of a term formerly held by Uresti. Flores was endorsed by U.S. Senators John Cornyn and Ted Cruz, Governor Greg Abbott, and Lt. Governor Dan Patrick. During the campaign he stated that his focus would be on property tax reform, economic development, support for law enforcement, support for the unborn, and support for the 2nd Amendment.

2020 general election

Flores ran for re-election in 2020. He lost to Democratic nominee Roland Gutierrez by three points. The election ended with the district going towards the Democrats, having the Republican-led State Senate losing their supermajority.

2022 State Senate election

Flores won the Republican primary runoff for State Senate District 24 on May 24, 2022, defeating Raul Reyes 59% to 41%. Flores has the backing of Lt. Governor Dan Patrick and former incumbent of the seat, Dawn Buckingham, who resigned the seat to run for the statewide office of land commissioner. Flores won in the General Election against democratic opponent, Kathy Jones-Hospod.

Political positions

Property tax reform
Flores supports lowering Texas's property taxes. He believes that Texas taxpayers are overtaxed and the current tax rates are unsustainable. He wants to change the way property is being appraised. He wants a uniform methodology of appraisal that is consistent throughout Texas, instead of having 254 different counties using 254 different ways, limiting the role of individual chief appraisers in the each county. He wants the appraisers to be accountable to the voters. He wants the members of the board of appraisal districts to be voted in office, instead of appointed by taxing entities, making them directly accountable to the voters, removing the buffer that separates the taxing entities and the voters that currently exists. He has said, "The system is broken. We need some meaningful tax reform so you and I can keep our houses and we won’t be taxed out of our property. We want to pay our fair share, but it’s not right to have a system that’s not fair and equitable."

Abortion
Flores identifies as pro-life.

Personal life
Flores and his wife Elizabeth, married in 1982, live in Pleasanton, Texas, where he decided to retire after working for 27 years as a state peace officer. They have two children and two grandchildren. Flores has six sisters who are all school teachers.

Electoral history

References

External links

 Pete Flores Peter Flores' Biography from Vote Smart

1960 births
Living people
Republican Party Texas state senators
Texas A&M University alumni
21st-century American politicians
American law enforcement officials
American people of Spanish descent
Hispanic and Latino American state legislators in Texas
People from Atascosa County, Texas
People from Laredo, Texas
Latino conservatism in the United States